The 2022 Subway Atlantic University Sport Curling Championships was held from March 17 to 19 at the Windsor Curling Club in Windsor, Nova Scotia. Usually, the top men's team along with the top two women's teams qualify for the U Sports/Curling Canada University Curling Championships, however, it was cancelled due to the COVID-19 pandemic.

Men

Teams
The teams are listed as follows:

Round robin standings 
Final round robin standings

Round robin results 
All draw times are listed in Atlantic Time (UTC−03:00).

Draw 1
Friday, March 17, 3:00 pm

Draw 2
Saturday, March 18, 2:00 pm

Draw 3
Saturday, March 18, 7:00 pm

Playoffs

Semifinal
Sunday, March 19, 9:30 am

Final
Sunday, March 19, 2:00 pm

Women

Teams
The teams are listed as follows:

Round robin standings 
Final round robin standings

Round robin results 
All draw times are listed in Atlantic Time (UTC−03:00).

Draw 1
Friday, March 17, 3:00 pm

Draw 2
Saturday, March 18, 2:00 pm

Draw 3
Saturday, March 18, 7:00 pm

Playoffs

Semifinal
Sunday, March 19, 9:30 am

Final
Sunday, March 19, 2:00 pm

References

External links
Official Website
Results

2022 in Canadian curling
Sport in Nova Scotia
Curling competitions in Nova Scotia
2022 in Nova Scotia
March 2022 sports events in Canada
Hants County, Nova Scotia